APSI (an abbreviation of "Agencia Publicitaria de Servicios Informativos") was a Chilean magazine aimed as means of political opposition to the Pinochet dictatorship. It was headquartered in Santiago.

History
One of the tactics of the dictatorship was to isolate the public from international news and outside influences in order to maintain its stranglehold on information. Following the 1975 shutdown of the human rights organization  in response to a political offensive by the Pinochet regime, Precht, then Vicar, allowed the ex-employees to issue grant requests to European commissions.  One of the European applications was a project to create a news agency about international news. This request by Arturo Navarro, an ex-Comité employee, resulted in a grant of seven thousand dollars, and APSI was born.

APSI was published on a weekly basis. Due to the climate of censorship in Chile the magazine focused initially on international news. APSI was published with support of the Popular Unitary Action Movement until late 1978. In 1979 the magazine began reporting on local issues including the numerous human rights violations of the dictatorship.

See also
Book burnings in Chile
Guillo
Human rights violations in Pinochet's Chile

References

External links
Online archive

1976 establishments in Chile
1995 disestablishments in Chile
Defunct magazines published in Chile
Magazines established in 1976
Magazines disestablished in 1995
Mass media in Santiago
Military dictatorship of Chile (1973–1990)
News magazines published in South America
Spanish-language magazines
Weekly magazines